Anil Bhaidas Patil is an Indian politician and a member of the 14th Maharashtra Legislative Assembly. He represents Amalner (Vidhan Sabha constituency) and he belongs to the Nationalist Congress Party. He is the only elected MLA in the district belonging to Nationalist Congress Party.

References

Maharashtra MLAs 2019–2024
Living people
Nationalist Congress Party politicians
Nationalist Congress Party politicians from Maharashtra
Year of birth missing (living people)